The 2022 Hankook Dubai 24 Hour was the 17th running of the Dubai 24 Hour, an endurance race that took place at the Dubai Autodrome on 14 and 15 January 2022. It was also the first round of the 2022 24H GT Series and TCE Series. The race was won by Axcil Jefferies, Christopher Mies, Thomas Neubauer, Mohammed Saud Fahad Al Saud and Dries Vanthoor in the MS7 by WRT Audi R8 LMS Evo.

Schedule

Entry list
80 cars are entered into the event; 61 GT cars and 19 TCEs. 2 cars were removed from the entry list after crashes in private test sessions.

Results

Qualifying
Both GT and TCE qualifying sessions featured three parts, all of which would feature one driver in every car, an average lap time would be taken and applied to every car.

GT
Fastest in class in bold.

TCE
Fastest in class in bold.

Race
Class winner in bold.

Footnotes

References

External links

Dubai 24 Hour
Dubai
Dubai
Dubai